A bondage suit, also commonly called a gimp suit, is a garment designed to cover the body completely (usually including the hands and feet), fitting it closely, and often including anchor points for bondage. It often has an attached hood; if it does not, it often is worn with a bondage hood or "gimp mask". The suit may be made from any material--leather, PVC, rubber, spandex, and darlexx are the most usual. Leather, not being stretchy, cannot fit as tightly as the others.

Use
A bondage suit is used in BDSM to objectify the wearer, or gimp, and reduce them to the status of a sexual toy, rather than a sexual partner. Sometimes there are suitably placed zippers, to allow the breasts and genitals to be directly accessible while the suit is worn.

While it sometimes differs from a catsuit, unitard, or zentai more in purpose than appearance, the typical bondage suit is black and of very tear-resistant material (often reinforced by straps and barely stretchable) and includes integrated metal rings, belts, buckles, and laces to fasten it and to attach ropes or chains, as to lift and hang the wearer.

In popular culture
Such suits are sometimes called a gimp suit,
a term popularized by its use in Quentin Tarantino's movie Pulp Fiction.

See also

Bondage hood
Doll fetish

References

BDSM equipment
Fetish clothing